The Barrings is a 1955 West German historical drama film directed by Rolf Thiele and starring Dieter Borsche, Nadja Tiller and Paul Hartmann. It was shot at the Göttingen Studios with sets designed by the art director Walter Haag.

Cast
 Dieter Borsche as Fried von Barring
 Nadja Tiller as Gerda von Eyff
 Paul Hartmann as Archibald von Barring
 Sonja Sutter as Gisa von Eyff
 Heinz Hilpert as Baron von Eyff
 Jan Hendriks as Graf Wilda
 Lil Dagover as Thilde von Barring
 Olga Tschechowa as Amelie von Eyff
 Ida Wüst as Tante Ulrike
 Tilo von Berlepsch as Emanuel von Eyff
 Ernst von Klipstein as Dr. Bremer
 Erik von Loewis as Hofrat Herbst
 Benno Hoffmann as Gutsinspektor Barbknecht
 Friedmar Apel as Malte mit 4 Jahren
 Hartmut Apel as Malte mit 2 Jahren
 Eugen Bergen as Arnoldi
 Gerhard Holleschek as Lachmanski, Kaufmann
 Hartmut Krüger as Archie mit 8 Jahren
 Burghard Ortgies as Archie mit 4 Jahren
 Andrea Schoder as Wirtschafterin Charlotte

References

Bibliography 
 Bock, Hans-Michael & Bergfelder, Tim. The Concise CineGraph. Encyclopedia of German Cinema. Berghahn Books, 2009.

External links 
 

1955 films
German historical drama films
1950s historical drama films
West German films
1950s German-language films
Films directed by Rolf Thiele
Films set in the 1870s
Films set in the 1880s
Films set in Prussia
Films based on German novels
1955 drama films
German black-and-white films
1950s German films
Films shot at Göttingen Studios